Aslan Goisum (born 1991, Grozny, Checheno-Ingush ASSR) is a contemporary artist based in Grozny.

Life and work 
Aslan Goisum was born in Grozny in 1991. He graduated from the Institute of Contemporary Art in Moscow in 2012, Higher Institute of Fine Arts in Ghent in 2017, and Rijksakademie van Beeldende Kunsten in Amsterdam in 2019.

Goisum, who grew up in Chechnya, has gained recognition for his visually and conceptually convincing articulations of the country’s colonial history and recent past. Working with the moving image, with objects and installations and works on paper, he has established himself as a shrewd, sophisticated transformer of historical wrongdoing – and in particular the void of silence that all too often cordons it off – into crystalline images that unite the corporeal and the analytic, the incandescent and the meditative. He tends to mine memory – collective and personal, political and cultural – for clues about colonial realities, how they have been endured and how they might be undone. Identities come into play in his work, as embodied effects of violence perpetrated or unfreedom suffered but also as possible openings, new beginnings.

The artist's first solo exhibition entitled "Untitled (War)" was held in 2011 at Winzavod Center for Contemporary Art in Moscow. Since then, he has participated in numerous international exhibitions.

His works are in the collections of Stedeljik Museum (Amsterdam); Kadist Art Foundation (Paris, San Francisco);  MuHKA (Antwerp); Tate Modern (London); Hamburger Kunsthalle (Hamburg); Louis Vuitton Foundation (Paris) as well as in many private collections around the world.

In 2019, Aslan Goisum was included in the Forbes rating "30 under 30" as one of the most promising artists in the Russian Federation. Also he was included in "Russian investment art rating, "Outstanding contemporary Russian artists under the age of 50; "Russian Investment Art Rating 49ART"; "Top 10 Most Notable Young Artists" by The Art Newspaper Russia.

He is represented by Emalin, London, UK and Galerie Zink, Waldkirchen, Germany.

Solo exhibitions 
 2011 — «Untitled (War)».Moscow Contemporary Art Center Winzavod. Curated by Elena Yaichnikova.
 2013 — «Aslan Goisum». Galerie Zink, Berlin.
 2015 — «Нохчийн Вордана Хиъча, Нохчийи Илли Ала». Center for Contemporary Art, Grozny.
 2015 — «Memory belongs to the stones». Kromus + Zink, Berlin.
 2016 — «People of No Consequence». M HKA, Antwerp. Curated by Anders Kreuger.
 2018 — «Crystals and Shards», Kohta, Helsinki, Finland. Curated by Anders Kreuger. 
 2018 — «All That You See Here, Forget». Emalin, London. Curated by Anna Smolak.
 2018 — «Dark Shelters», LE CAP Centre d’arts Plastiques, Saint-Fons, France. Curated by Nicolas Audureau.
 2019 — «If No One Asks». Contemporary Art Gallery, Vancouver, Canade. Curated by Kimberly Phillips.

Key group exhibitions 
 2012 — «Under a Tinsel Sun». III Moscow International Biennale for Young Art, Central House of Artists, Moscow, Russian Federation. 
 2012 — «I am who I am». KIT. Dusseldorf, Germany.
 2012 — «Counter Illusions». Gallery 21, Moscow, Russian Federation.
 2012 — «Stalker: Art in the Factory». VNIIMETMASH, Moscow, Russian Federation.
 2012 — «It Seems That Something Is Missing Here». Vinzavod Center of Contemporary Art, Moscow, Russian Federation.
 2012 — «Meeting The Unknown». Central House of Artists, Moscow, Russian Federation.
 2012 — «Art for Fake». Gallery K35, Moscow, Russian Federation.
 2013 — 5th Moscow Biennale. Central Exhibition Hall Manege, Moscow, Russian Federation.
 2013 — «Summer.Kunst.Fresh». Resident's exhibition, Bad Gastein, Austria.
 2013 — «Past Imperfect». Festival TodaysArt, The Hague, Netherlands.
 2014 — «Burning News». Hayward Gallery, London, UK.
 2014 — «Native Foreigners». Garage Museum of Contemporary Art, Moscow, Russian Federation. 
 2014 — «Generation Start». Cadet Corps, Manifesta 10, St Petersburg, Russian Federation.
 2014 — «Printed Matter». Museum of Printing, Manifesta 10, St Petersburg, Russian Federation.
 2014 — «Discontinuous Values». Alania, National Centre for Contemporary Art, Vladikavkaz, Russian Federation.
 2014 — «Project with Accent». Theatre Open Stage, Moscow, Russian Federation.
 2015 — «Lines Of Tangency». Museum of Fine Arts, Ghent, Belgium.
 2015 — «Skulptur 2015». Skulpturenmuseum Glaskasten Marl, Marl, Germany.
 2015 — «Austeria». BWA SOKOL GALLERY. Nowy Sącz, Poland.
 2015 — «Our Land/Alien Territory». Central Exhibition Hall Manege, Moscow, Russian Federation.
 2015 — «The Identity Complex». Alania, National Centre for Contemporary Art, Vladikavkaz, Russian Federation.
 2015 — «Glasstress 2015 Gotika». Palazzo Franchetti, Venice Biennale, Venice, Italy.
 2015 — «The World in 2015». UCCA Center for Contemporary Art, Beijing, China.
 2015 — «Future Generation Art Prize 2014». 21 Shortlisted Artists, Pinchuk Art Centre, Kiev, Ukraine.
 2016 — «Uncertain States». Akademie der Künste, Berlin.
 2016 — «Across the Caucasus». Tbilisi History Museum, Tbilisi, Georgia. 
 2016 — «Experiences of the Imaginary». New Holland, St Petersburg, Russian Federation.
 2016 — «Fortress Europe». Eastern Baston, KH Space, Brest, Belarus.
 2016 — «Transgression and Syncretism». ACC. Gwangju, South Korea.
 2016 — «Höhenrausch». Eigen + Art Lab, Berlin, Germany.
 2016 — «Greetings from Ghent». Zink Gallery, Waldkirchen, Germany.
 2017 — «I Am a Native Foreigner». Stedelijk Museum, Amsterdam, Netherlands.
 2017 — «Belonging to a Place». SCRAP Metal Gallery, Toronto, Canada.
 2017 — «A World Not Ours». Kunsthalle Mulhouse, Mulhouse, France. 
 2017 — «Americans 2017». LUMA Westbau, Zurich, Switzerland. 
 2017 — «Heimat and Homeland». Museion, Bolzano, Italy.
 2017 — «The Haunted House». Cultural Foundation Ekaterina, Moscow, Russian Federation. 
 2017 — «Witness». Galerie Jérôme Poggi, Paris, France.
 2017 — «Life From My Window». Laura Bulian Gallery, Milan, Italy.
 2017 — «The Raft. Art Is (Not) Lonely». Mu.ZEE, Ostend, Belgium.
 2017 — «Hämatli & Patriæ». Museion, Bolzano, Italy.
 2017 — «Triennial of Russian Contemporary Art». Garage Museum of Contemporary Art», Moscow, Russian Federation.
 2017 — «Inconvenient Questions». Tartu Art Museum, Tartu, Estonia. 
 2017 — «Bilder Fragen». Centre for Contemporary Art Glass Palace, Augsburg, Germany.
 2017 — «Nationality». Victoria Gallery, Samara, Russian Federation.
 2017 — «Lives Between». Kadist Art Foundation, San Francisco, US.
 2017 — «How To Live Together». Kunsthalle Wien. Vienna, Austria.
 2018 — «Beautiful World, Where are you?». 10th Liverpool Biennial, Liverpool, UK.
 2018 — «Everything Was Forever Until It Was No More». 1st Riga Biennale, Riga, Latvia.
 2018 — «Here We Meet». The Galaxy Museum of Contemporary Art, Chongqing, China.
 2018 — «Tomorrow Will Be Yesterday». ERTI Gallery, Tbilisi, Georgia. 
 2018 — «Power Nap». Museum of Modern Art. Yerevan, Armenia.
 2018 — «Belonging to a Place». Embassy of Canada, Washington DC, US.
 2018 — «One Place After Another». («Удел человеческий», IV сессия.) Jewish Museum and Tolerance Center. Moscow.
 2019 — «Tell me about yesterday tomorrow». Munich Documentation Centre. Munich, Germany.
 2019 — «Boundary + Gesture». Wysing Arts Centre, Cambridge, UK. 
 2019 — «After Leaving / Before Arriving». 12th Kaunas Biennale, Kaunas, Lithuania.
 2019 — «No You Won't Be Naming No Buildings After Me». TENT, Rotterdam, The Netherlands.
 2019 — «Potentiality». Festival of Political Photography 2019, The Finnish Museum of Photography, Helsinki, Finland.
 2019 — «Open Ground». Void Gallery, Derry, Northern Ireland.
 2019 — «The I is Always in the Field of the Other». Evliyagil Museum, Ankara, Turkey.
 2020 — «The Invented History». KINDL. Berlin, Germany.
 2020 — «Mourning: On Loss and Change», Hamburger Kunsthalle, Hamburg, Germany.
 2020 — «Home/Ward Bound/Less». Budapest Gallery, Budapest, Hungary.
 2020 — «Communicating Difficult Pasts». Latvian National Museum of Art, Riga, Latvia.
 2021 — «Tenderness of The Unknown». AllArtNow Gallery, Stockholm, Sweden.

Recognition

Awards 
 2014 — Future Generation Art Prize.

Ratings 
 2015 — The artist's works entitled "February 23 / May 10" and "Elimination" were included in the list of "50 Most Important artworks of 2014" compiled by the editors of Aroundart.
 2016 —included in the list of "Top 10 Most Notable Young [Russian] Artists", compiled by The Art Newspaper Russia.
 2019 — Forbes rating "30 under 30".
 Russian investment art rating 49ART, "Outstanding contemporary Russian artists under the age of 50."

Collections 
 Tate Modern, London, UK.
 Stedeljik Museum, Amsterdam, The Netherlands.
 M HKA Museum of Contemporary Art Antwerp, Belgium.
 Hamburger Kunsthalle, Hamburg, Germany.
 Louis Vuitton Foundation, Paris, France.
 Kadist Art Foundation, Paris, France and San Francisco, US.

Publications 
 Gaisumov, Aslan, Aleida Assmann, Georgi M. Derluguian, Anders Kreuger, and M. V. Tlostanova. Keicheyuhea. Berlin: Sternberg, 2018. Print. — 151 pages. — 1500 copies — .

References 

Living people
Russian contemporary artists
1991 births
Russian video artists
People from Grozny
Institute of Contemporary Art, Moscow alumni